Micromonosporaceae is a family of bacteria of the class Actinomycetia. They are gram-positive, spore-forming soil organisms that form a true mycelium.

Genera
Micromonosporaceae comprises the following genera:

 Actinocatenispora Thawai et al. 2006
 Actinoplanes Couch 1950 (Approved Lists 1980)
 Actinorhabdospora Mingma et al. 2016
 Allocatelliglobosispora Lee and Lee 2011
 Allorhizocola Sun et al. 2019

 Asanoa Lee and Hah 2002
 Catellatospora Asano and Kawamoto 1986
 Catelliglobosispora Ara et al. 2008
 Catenuloplanes Yokota et al. 1993
 Couchioplanes Tamura et al. 1994
 Dactylosporangium Thiemann et al. 1967 (Approved Lists 1980)
 Hamadaea Ara et al. 2008

 Krasilnikovia Ara and Kudo 2007
 Longispora Matsumoto et al. 2003
 Luedemannella Ara and Kudo 2007
 Mangrovihabitans Liu et al. 2017
 Micromonospora Ørskov 1923 (Approved Lists 1980)
 "Natronosporangium" Sorokin et al. 2022
 Phytohabitans Inahashi et al. 2010
 Phytomonospora Li et al. 2011
 Pilimelia Kane 1966 (Approved Lists 1980)

 Planosporangium Wiese et al. 2008
 Plantactinospora Qin et al. 2009
 Polymorphospora Tamura et al. 2006
 Pseudosporangium Ara et al. 2008
 Rhizocola Matsumoto et al. 2014
 Rugosimonospora Monciardini et al. 2009
 Salinispora Maldonado et al. 2005
 "Solwaraspora" Magarvey et al. 2004
 Spirilliplanes Tamura et al. 1997

 Virgisporangium corrig. Tamura et al. 2001

 "Wangella" Jia et al. 2013

Phylogeny
The currently accepted taxonomy is based on the List of Prokaryotic names with Standing in Nomenclature (LPSN). The phylogeny is based on whole-genome analysis.

Notes

References 

Micromonosporaceae
Soil biology